Gazvar or Gazur may refer to:
Gazur, Ardabil
Gazvar-e Olya, Ardabil Province
Gazvar-e Sofla, Ardabil Province
Gazvar, Semnan
Gazur, Sistan and Baluchestan